Nicole Rocha Silveira (born 7 May 1994) is a Brazilian skeleton racer and former bobsledder who competes on the Skeleton World Cup.

Career
Silveira made her Skeleton World Cup debut in the 2018–19 season, finishing in 25th place. In the following season, she finished in 24th place. In the 2020–21 season, she finished 22nd.
Silveira also competed in the 2017–18 Bobsleigh World Cup, where she placed 18th in the standings. 

She represented Brazil at the 2022 Winter Olympics.

Personal life
Silveira, who is openly bisexual, is in a relationship with fellow skeleton racer Kim Meylemans.

References

External links 

1994 births
Living people
Brazilian female bobsledders
Brazilian female skeleton racers
Skeleton racers at the 2022 Winter Olympics
Olympic skeleton racers of Brazil
Brazilian LGBT sportspeople
Bisexual sportspeople
LGBT skeleton racers
Sportspeople from Rio Grande do Sul
People from Rio Grande (Rio Grande do Sul)
LGBT bobsledders